"Pablo Picasso" is a song written by Jonathan Richman for the proto punk group the Modern Lovers. The song was recorded in 1972 at Whitney Studios in Los Angeles, and produced by John Cale, but was not released until 1976, on the Modern Lovers' self-titled debut album. The recording featured Richman (lead guitar, vocals), Ernie Brooks (second guitar), Jerry Harrison (bass) and David Robinson (drums), with Cale playing the repetitive hammered piano part.

The central character of the song is the charismatic 20th century artist Pablo Picasso. With dry wit, the lyrics suggest that women never rejected Picasso's romantic advances, despite his short stature. "Well he was only five foot three but girls could not resist his stare / Pablo Picasso was never called an asshole / Not in New York". In a 1980 interview, Richman stated that the song was inspired by his own adolescent "self-consciousness" with women.

Cover versions

On recordings
1975 – John Cale, on his album Helen of Troy (released before the original version)
1979 – Catholic Discipline on album Underground Babylon a collection of live recordings.
1984 – Burning Sensations on the Repo Man soundtrack
1991 – Phranc's version of the song substitutes Gertrude Stein as the central character; it appears on her album Positively Phranc
1998 – Television Personalities on Don't Cry Baby... It's Only a Movie
1999 - The Mentally Ill on the album Strike the Bottom Red
2003 – David Bowie, on his album Reality; a live version recorded at Riverside Studios, Hammersmith, London on 8 September 2003 was released on the 'Tour Edition' of Reality
2007 – Blue Peter, on their album Burning Bridges, recorded live in 1980
2007 – Four Year Beard on the album Hero: The Main Man Records Tribute to David Bowie (2007)
2012 – The Tellers on the album A Tribute to Repo Man
2018 – Jack White for a live Spotify Singles release
2022 – Chatterbox on the album When the Creatures Crawl

Live performances
1998 Siouxsie - the Creatures with John Cale during their 1998 US double bill tour.

Notes

1976 songs
Cultural depictions of Pablo Picasso
David Bowie songs
Songs about painters
Song recordings produced by John Cale
The Modern Lovers songs
Protopunk songs